The Intel Atom is Intel's line of low-power, low-cost and low-performance x86 and x86-64 microprocessors. Atom, with codenames of Silverthorne and Diamondville, was first announced on March 2, 2008.

For Nettop and Netbook Atom Microprocessors after Diamondville, the memory and graphics controller are moved from the northbridge to the CPU. This explains the drastically increased transistor count for post-Diamondville Atom microprocessors.

Nettop processors (small desktop)

Bonnell microarchitecture

"Diamondville" (45 nm)
 All models support: MMX, SSE, SSE2, SSE3, SSSE3, Intel 64, XD bit (an NX bit implementation), Hyper-Threading
 Transistors: 47 million
 Die size: 25.96 mm² (3.27 × 7.94)
 Package size: 22 mm × 22 mm

"Pineview" (45 nm)
 All models support: MMX, SSE, SSE2, SSE3, SSSE3, Intel 64, XD bit (an NX bit implementation), Hyper-Threading
 Integrated GMA 3150 GPU and DDR3/DDR2 single-channel memory controller
 Transistors: 123 million (single-core), 176 million (dual-core)
 Die size: 66 mm² (9.56 × 6.89) (single-core), 87 mm² (9.56 × 9.06) (dual core)
 Package size: 22 mm × 22 mm

"Cedarview" (32 nm)
 All models support: MMX, SSE, SSE2, SSE3, SSSE3, Intel 64, XD bit (an NX bit implementation), Hyper-Threading (D2550, D2560, D2700, D2701 only)
 Integrated PowerVR SGX545-based Intel GMA 3600/GMA 3650 GPU and DDR3 single-channel memory controller
 Package size: 22 mm × 22 mm

Netbook processors (sub-notebook)

Bonnell microarchitecture

"Diamondville" (45 nm)
 All models support: MMX, SSE, SSE2, SSE3, SSSE3, Enhanced Intel SpeedStep Technology (EIST), XD bit (an NX bit implementation), Hyper-Threading
 Transistors: 47 million
 Die size: 26 mm²
 Package size: 22 mm × 22 mm

"Pineview" (45 nm)

 All models support: MMX, SSE, SSE2, SSE3, SSSE3, Intel 64, Enhanced Intel SpeedStep Technology (EIST), XD bit (an NX bit implementation), Hyper-Threading
 Integrated GMA 3150 GPU and DDR3/DDR2 single-channel memory controller supporting up to 2 GB
 Transistors: 123 million (single-core), 176 million (dual-core)
 Die size: 66 mm² (9.56 × 6.89) (single-core), 87 mm² (9.56 × 9.06) (dual core)
 Package size: 22 mm × 22 mm

"Cedarview" (32 nm)
 All models support: MMX, SSE, SSE2, SSE3, SSSE3, Intel 64, Enhanced Intel SpeedStep Technology (EIST), XD bit (an NX bit implementation), Hyper-Threading
 Integrated PowerVR SGX545-based Intel GMA 3600/GMA 3650 GPU and DDR3 single-channel memory controller
 Package size: 22 × 22 mm

MID processors/SoCs (UMPC/Smartphone/IoT)

Bonnell microarchitecture

"Silverthorne" (45 nm)
 All models support: MMX, SSE, SSE2, SSE3, SSSE3, Enhanced Intel SpeedStep Technology (EIST), XD bit (an NX bit implementation), Hyper-Threading
 Models Z520, Z520PT, Z530, Z530P, Z540, Z550 and Z560 support Intel VT-x
 Model Z515 supports Intel Burst Performance Technology
 Uses the Poulsbo chipset.
 Transistors: 47 million
 Die size: 26 mm²
 Package size: 13 mm × 14 mm / 22 mm × 22 mm (processors ending with the P or PT sSpec number)

"Lincroft" (45 nm)
 All models support: MMX, SSE, SSE2, SSE3, SSSE3, Enhanced Intel SpeedStep Technology (EIST), XD bit (an NX bit implementation), Hyper-Threading. All except Z605 support Intel Burst Performance Technology (BPT).
 GMA 600 GPU and DDR2 single-channel memory controller are integrated into the processor.
 Transistors: 140 million
 Die size: 7.34 mm × 8.89 mm = 65.2526 mm²
 Package size: 13.8 mm × 13.8 × 1.0 mm
 Steppings: C0

"Penwell" (32 nm)
 All models support: MMX, SSE, SSE2, SSE3, SSSE3, Enhanced Intel SpeedStep Technology (EIST), XD bit (an NX bit implementation), Intel Burst Performance Technology (BPT), Hyper-Threading.
 Integrated PowerVR SGX540 GPU and DDR3 single-channel memory controller
 Package size: 12 mm × 12 × 1.0 mm

Silvermont microarchitecture

"Merrifield" (22 nm)
 All models support: MMX, SSE, SSE2, SSE3, SSSE3, SSE4.1, SSE4.2, Enhanced Intel SpeedStep Technology (EIST), Intel 64, XD bit (an NX bit implementation), Intel VT-x, AES-NI, Intel Burst Performance Technology (BPT).
 Z3480 also supports Intel Wireless Display.
 Integrated PowerVR G6400 GPU, memory controller supporting two 32-bit LPDDR3 channels up to 4 GB, USB 3.0 controller, eMMC 4.5
 Paired with Intel XMM 7160 LTE modem supporting 4G/3G/2G

 Package size: 12 mm × 12 × 1.0 mm

"Moorefield" (22 nm)
 All models support: MMX, SSE, SSE2, SSE3, SSSE3, SSE4.1, SSE4.2, Enhanced Intel SpeedStep Technology (EIST), Intel 64, XD bit (an NX bit implementation), Intel VT-x, AES-NI, Intel Burst Performance Technology (BPT), Intel Wireless Display.
 GPU (PowerVR G6430) and memory controller are integrated onto the processor die
 Package size: 14 mm × 14 × 1.0 mm

"SoFIA" (28 nm)

 SoFIA (smart or feature phone with Intel architecture)
 All models support: MMX, SSE, SSE2, SSE3, SSSE3, SSE4, Enhanced Intel SpeedStep Technology (EIST), Intel 64, XD bit (an NX bit implementation), Intel Burst Performance Technology (BPT), Intel VT-x, AES-NI (based on Silvermont's specs)
 GPU (ARM Mali) and memory controller are integrated onto the processor die
 Package size: 34 × 40 mm
 SoFIA 3G SoC with Silvermont CPU
Integrated HSPA+ A-GOLD 620: 2G/3G RF, CNV, PMU, Audio (Atom x3-C3130)
 SoFIA 3G–R SoC with Silvermont CPU
Integrated HSPA+ A-GOLD 620: 2G/3G RF, CNV, PMU, Audio (Atom x3-C3230RK)
 SoFIA LTE (W) with Airmont CPU (Announced, but never launched)
Integrated LTE Cat. 4 (XG726-based), SMARTi 4.5, LnP/ CG2000, PMIC (Atom x3-C3440 & C3445)

Tablet processors/SoCs

Bonnell microarchitecture

"Lincroft" (45 nm)
 All models support: MMX, SSE, SSE2, SSE3, SSSE3, Enhanced Intel SpeedStep Technology (EIST), XD bit (an NX bit implementation), Hyper-Threading. All except Z605 support Intel Burst Performance Technology (BPT).
 GMA 600 GPU and DDR2 single-channel memory controller are integrated onto the processor die
 Transistors: 140 million
 Die size: 7.34 mm × 8.89 mm = 65.2526 mm²
 Package size: 13.8 mm × 13.8 × 1.0 mm
 Steppings: C0

"Cloverview" (32 nm)
 All models support: MMX, SSE, SSE2, SSE3, SSSE3, Enhanced Intel SpeedStep Technology (EIST), XD bit (an NX bit implementation), Hyper-Threading, Intel Burst Performance Technology (BPT).
 GPU and memory controller are integrated onto the processor die
 Package size: 13.8 mm × 13.8 × 1.0 mm
 Steppings:B1, C0

No official TDP available. For power data see page 129-130.

Silvermont microarchitecture

"Bay Trail-T" (22 nm)
 All models support: MMX, SSE, SSE2, SSE3, SSSE3, SSE4, Enhanced Intel SpeedStep Technology (EIST), Intel 64, XD bit (an NX bit implementation), Intel Burst Performance Technology (BPT), Intel VT-x, AES-NI, TXT/TXE
 Package size: 17 mm × 17 × 1.0 mm
Type 4 SoC:
 DDR3L single-channel or LPDDR3 dual-channel memory controller supporting up to 4 GB; ECC supported in single-channel mode
 Display controller with 2 MIPI DSI ports and 2 DDI ports (eDP 1.3, DP 1.1a, DVI, or HDMI 1.4a)
 Integrated Intel HD Graphics (Gen7) GPU
 One USB 3.0 controller supporting one USB 3.0 port (can be multiplexed to support four USB 2.0 ports)
 One USB 2.0 controller supporting four ports
 Integrated LPE audio controller
 Integrated image signal processor supporting two MIPI CSI ports, 24 MP sensors, and stereoscopic video
 Integrated memory card reader supporting SDIO 3.0, eMMC 4.51, and SDXC
 Serial I/O supporting SPI, UART (serial port), I2C or PWM
Type 3 SoC:
 DDR3L/L-RS single-channel memory controller supporting up to 2 GB
 Display controller with 1 MIPI DSI port and 2 DDI ports (HDMI 1.4)
 Integrated Intel HD Graphics (Gen7) GPU
 One USB controller supporting two USB 2.0 ports
 Integrated LPE audio controller
 Integrated image signal processor supporting two MIPI CSI ports and 8 MP sensors
 Integrated memory card reader supporting SDIO 3.0, eMMC 4.51, and SDXC
 Serial I/O supporting SPI, UART (serial port), I2C or PWM

Airmont microarchitecture

"Cherry Trail-T" (14 nm)
 All models support: MMX, SSE, SSE2, SSE3, SSSE3, SSE4, Enhanced Intel SpeedStep Technology (EIST), Intel 64, XD bit (an NX bit implementation), Intel VT-x2 (VT-x with EPT, FlexMigration, FlexPriority and VPID), AES-NI., TXT/TXE
 Package size: 17 mm × 17 × 1.0 mm
Type 4 SoC:
 LPDDR3 dual-channel memory controller supporting up to 8 GB
 PCI Express 2.0 controller with 2 lanes
 Display controller with 2 MIPI DSI ports and 3 DDI ports (eDP 1.3, DP 1.1a, DVI, or HDMI 1.4b)
 Integrated Intel HD Graphics (Gen8) GPU
 One USB xHCI controller supporting three USB 3.0 ports, two SSCI ports, and two HSIC ports
 One USB xDCI controller supporting one USB 3.0 port
 Integrated LPE audio controller
 Integrated image signal processor supporting three MIPI CSI ports and 13 MP ZLS sensors
 Integrated memory card reader supporting SDIO 3.0, eMMC 4.51, and SDXC
 Serial I/O supporting SPI, UART (serial port), I2C or PWM
Type 3 SoC:
 DDR3L/L-RS single-channel memory controller supporting up to 2 GB
 PCI Express 2.0 controller with 1 lane
 Display controller with 2 MIPI DSI ports and 2 DDI ports (eDP 1.3, DP 1.1a, DVI, or HDMI 1.4b)
 Integrated Intel HD Graphics (Gen8) GPU
 One USB controller supporting three USB 2.0 ports and two HSIC ports
 Integrated LPE audio controller
 Integrated image signal processor supporting three MIPI CSI ports and 8 MP sensors
 Integrated memory card reader supporting SDIO 3.0, eMMC 4.51, and SDXC
 Serial I/O supporting SPI, UART (serial port), I2C or PWM

Embedded processors/SoCs

Bonnell microarchitecture

"Tunnel Creek" (45 nm)
 CPU core supports IA-32 architecture, MMX, SSE, SSE2, SSE3, SSSE3, Enhanced Intel SpeedStep Technology (EIST), hyper-threading, Intel VT-x.
 Package size: 22 mm × 22 mm
 Steppings: B0
 Temperature range: for (E620, E640, E660, E680): 0 °C to +70 °C, for (E620T, E640T, E660T, E680T): -40 °C to +85 °C.
 DDR2 single-channel memory controller supporting up to 2 GB
 PCI Express 1.0a controller with 4 lanes
 Display controller with LVDS and serial DVO ports
 Integrated GMA600 (PowerVR) GPU
 Integrated HD audio controller
 Serial I/O supporting SPI

"Stellarton" (45 nm)
 "Tunnel Creek" CPU with an Altera Field Programmable Gate Array (FPGA)
 CPU core supports IA-32 architecture, MMX, SSE, SSE2, SSE3, SSSE3, Enhanced Intel SpeedStep Technology (EIST), Hyper-Threading, Intel VT-x
 Package size: 37.5 mm × 37.5 mm
 Steppings: B0
 TDP without FPGA. Total package TDP depends on functions included in FPGA. Max. TDP 7 W.
 Temperature range: for (E625C, E645C, E665C): 0 °C to +70 °C, for (E625CT, E645CT, E665CT): -40 °C to +85 °C.
 DDR2 single-channel memory controller supporting up to 2 GB
 PCI Express 1.0a controller with 4 lanes
 Display controller with LVDS and serial DVO ports
 Integrated GMA600 (PowerVR) GPU
 Integrated HD audio controller
 Serial I/O supporting SPI

Silvermont microarchitecture

"Bay Trail-I" (22 nm)
 All models support: MMX, SSE, SSE2, SSE3, SSSE3, Enhanced Intel SpeedStep Technology (EIST), Intel 64, XD bit (an NX bit implementation), Intel VT-x, AES-NI, TXT/TXE
 Package size: 25 mm × 27 mm
 DDR3L dual-channel memory controller supporting up to 4 GB; ECC supported in single-channel mode
 Display controller with 2 DDI ports (eDP 1.3, DP 1.1a, DVI, or HDMI 1.4a)
 Integrated Intel HD Graphics (Gen7) GPU
 PCI Express 2.0 controller with four lanes and four root ports
 Two SATA-300 ports
 One USB 3.0 controller supporting one USB 3.0 port (can be multiplexed to support four USB 2.0 ports)
 One USB 2.0 controller supporting four ports
 Integrated LPE and HD audio controllers
 Integrated image signal processor supporting three MIPI CSI ports, 24 MP sensors, and stereoscopic video
 Integrated memory card reader supporting SDIO 3.0, eMMC 4.5, and SDXC
 Serial I/O supporting SPI, UART (serial port), I2C or PWM

Airmont microarchitecture

"Braswell" (14 nm)
 All models support: MMX, SSE, SSE2, SSE3, SSSE3, SSE4.1, SSE4.2, Enhanced Intel SpeedStep Technology (EIST), Intel 64, XD bit (an NX bit implementation), Intel VT-x, AES-NI.
 GPU and memory controller are integrated onto the processor die
 GPU is based on Broadwell Intel HD Graphics, with 12 execution units, and supports DirectX 11.2, OpenGL 4.3, OpenGL ES 3.0 and OpenCL 1.2 (on Windows).
 Package size: 25 mm × 27 mm

Goldmont microarchitecture

"Apollo Lake" (14 nm)
 All models support: MMX, SSE, SSE2, SSE3, SSSE3, SSE4.1, SSE4.2, Enhanced Intel SpeedStep Technology (EIST), Intel 64, XD bit (an NX bit implementation), Intel VT-x, Intel VT-d, AES-NI, TXT/TXE
 Package size: 24 mm × 31 mm
 DDR3L/LPDDR3/LPDDR4 dual-channel memory controller supporting up to 8 GB; support for DDR3L with ECC
 Display controller with 1 MIPI DSI port and 2 DDI ports (eDP 1.3, DP 1.1a, or HDMI 1.4b)
 Integrated Intel HD Graphics (Gen9) GPU
 PCI Express 2.0 controller supporting 6 lanes (3 dedicated and 3 multiplexed with USB 3.0); 4 lanes available externally
 Two USB 3.0 ports (1 dual role, 1 dedicated, 3 multiplexed with PCI Express 2.0 and 1 multiplexed with one SATA-300 port)
 Two USB 2.0 ports
 Two SATA-600 ports (one multiplexed with USB 3.0)
 Integrated HD audio controller
 Integrated image signal processor supporting four MIPI CSI ports and 13 MP sensors
 Integrated memory card reader supporting SDIO 3.01 and eMMC 5.0
 Serial I/O supporting SPI, HSUART (serial port) and I2C

Tremont microarchitecture

"Elkhart Lake" (10 nm)
 All models support: MMX, SSE, SSE2, SSE3, SSSE3, SSE4.1, SSE4.2, Intel 64, XD bit (an NX bit implementation), Intel VT-x, Intel VT-d, AES-NI.
 GPU is based on Gen11 Intel HD Graphics, with up to 32 execution units, and supports up to 3 displays (4K @ 60 Hz) through HDMI, DP, eDP, or DSI.
 SoC peripherals include 4 × USB 2.0/3.0/3.1, 2 × SATA,  3 × 2.5GbE LAN, UART, and up to 8 lanes of PCI Express 3.0 in x4, x2, and x1 configurations.
 Package size: 35 mm × 24 mm

Server SoCs

All Atom server processors include ECC support.

Bonnell microarchitecture

"Centerton" (32 nm)
 All models support: MMX, SSE, SSE2, SSE3, SSSE3, Hyper-threading, Intel 64, Intel VT-x, ECC memory.

"Briarwood" (32 nm)
 All models support: MMX, SSE, SSE2, SSE3, SSSE3, Hyper-threading, Intel 64, Intel VT-x, ECC memory.

Silvermont microarchitecture

"Avoton" (22 nm)
 All models support: MMX, SSE, SSE2, SSE3, SSSE3, SSE4.1, SSE4.2, Enhanced Intel SpeedStep Technology (EIST), Intel Turbo Boost, Intel 64 (according to Datasheet), XD bit (an NX bit implementation), Intel VT-x, AES-NI, ECC memory.
 Dual-core SoC peripherals include 4 × USB 2.0, 2 × SATA, 2 × Integrated GbE LAN, 2 × UART, and 4 lanes of PCI Express 2.0, in x4, x2, and x1 configurations.
 Quad-core SoC peripherals include 4 × USB 2.0, 2 (C2530) or 6 (C2550) × SATA, 2 × Integrated GbE LAN, 2 × UART, and 8 lanes of PCI Express 2.0, in x8, x4, x2, and x1 configurations.
 C2730 SoC peripherals include 4 × USB 2.0, 2 × SATA, 2 × Integrated GbE LAN, 2 × UART, and 8 lanes of PCI Express 2.0, in x8, x4, x2, and x1 configurations.
 C2750 SoC peripherals include 4 × USB 2.0, 6 × SATA, 4 × Integrated GbE LAN, 2 × UART, and 16 lanes of PCI Express 2.0, in x16, x8, x4, x2, and x1 configurations.
 Package size: 34 mm × 28 mm
 Die size: 107 mm²

"Rangeley" (22 nm)
 All models support: MMX, SSE, SSE2, SSE3, SSSE3, SSE4.1, SSE4.2, Enhanced Intel SpeedStep Technology (EIST), Intel Turbo Boost, Intel 64, XD bit (an NX bit implementation), Intel VT-x, AES-NI, ECC memory.
 All models except C2x38 support Intel QuickAssist Technology (cryptography accelerator)
 SoC peripherals include 4 × USB 2.0, 4-6 × SATA (1 for C2308, 2 for C2316, C2508, C2516), 4 × Integrated GbE LAN (2 for C2316), 2 × UART, and 8-16 lanes of PCI Express 2.0 (4 lanes for C2308), in x16, x8, x4, x2, and x1 configurations.
 Package size: 34 mm × 28 mm

Goldmont microarchitecture

"Denverton" (14 nm)
 All models support: MMX, SSE, SSE2, SSE3, SSSE3, SSE4.1, SSE4.2, Enhanced Intel SpeedStep Technology (EIST), Intel Turbo Boost (dual-core, C3xx0, C3xx5 only), Intel 64, XD bit (an NX bit implementation), Intel VT-x, Intel VT-d, AES-NI, ECC memory.
 SoC peripherals include 8–16 × USB 3.0, 6–16 × SATA, 4 × Integrated 1GbE, 2.5GbE, and 10GbE (C3538 and up) LAN, and up to 20 lanes of PCI Express 3.0, in x8, x4, and x2 configurations.
 Package size: 34 mm × 28 mm

Tremont microarchitecture

"Snow Ridge" (10 nm)
 All models support: MMX, SSE, SSE2, SSE3, SSSE3, SSE4.1, SSE4.2, Intel 64, XD bit (an NX bit implementation), Intel VT-x, AES-NI, ECC memory.
 Same frequency for all models: 2.2 GHz. L2 cache: 4.5 MB per module; each module comprises four CPU cores.
 SoC peripherals include 4 × USB 3.0, 4 × USB 2.0, 16 × SATA, Integrated Intel Ethernet 800 series 100Gbps LAN, 3 × UART, and up to 32 lanes of PCI Express (16 × 2.0, 16 × 3.0), in x16, x8, and x4 configurations.
 Intel Dynamic Load Balancer (Intel DLB) & Intel QuickAssist Technology (Intel QAT)
 P####B models are designed for base transceiver stations, especially that for 5G networks.  All other models are designed for communications (extended temperature range).
 Package size: 47.5 mm × 47.5 mm

"Parker Ridge" (10 nm)
 All models support: MMX, SSE, SSE2, SSE3, SSSE3, SSE4.1, SSE4.2, Intel 64, XD bit (an NX bit implementation), Intel VT-x, AES-NI, ECC memory.
 SoC peripherals include 4 × USB 3.0, 4 × USB 2.0, 16 × SATA, Integrated Intel Ethernet 800 series 100Gbps LAN (except 51xx model numbers), 3 × UART, and up to 32 lanes of PCI Express (16 × 2.0, 16 × 3.0), in x16, x8, and x4 configurations.
 Intel Dynamic Load Balancer (Intel DLB) & Intel QuickAssist Technology (Intel QAT)
 Model numbers ending in 0 are extended temperature range; model numbers ending in 5 are commercial temperature range.
 Package size: 47.5 mm × 47.5 mm

CE SoCs

Single-core CE SoCs

"Sodaville" (45 nm)

 Package size: 27 mm × 27 mm
 GPU (based on the PowerVR SGX535 from Imagination Technologies)

"Groveland" (45 nm)
CE4200
 Package size: ?? mm × ?? mm
 2 × 32-bit memory channels, up to DDR2-800
 GPU (based on the PowerVR SGX535 from Imagination Technologies)

Dual-Core CE SoCs

"Berryville" (32 nm)

 Package size: ?? mm × ?? mm
 GPU for 3D (based on the PowerVR SGX545 from Imagination Technologies)
 GPU for 2D (GC300  from Vivante)

See also
 Atom (system on chip)
 Comparison of Intel processors
 List of Intel Celeron microprocessors
 Intel GMA
 Stealey (A100/A110)
 Geode (processor)
 VIA Nano
 Intel Quark
 Intel Edison

References

External links
 Intel Atom Processor - Overview
 SSPEC/QDF Reference (Intel)
 Intel Corporation - Processor Price List
 Intel Atom and VIA Nano performance compared
 Intel CPU Transition Roadmap 2008-2013 
 Intel Desktop CPU Roadmap 2004-2011

Atom
Lists of microprocessors